Vlassis is both a given name and a surname. Notable people with the name include:
Aristidis Vlassis (1947–2015), Greek painter
Vlassis Bonatsos (1949–2004), Greek actor
Vlassis Maras, Greek gymnast
Vlassis G. Rassias (1959–2019), Greek writer, religious leader
 Kostas Vlasis, Deputy Minister of Greeks abroad at the Ministry of Foreign Affairs (Greece)

See also 
Vlasis